The women's 100 metre butterfly competition of the swimming events at the 1963 Pan American Games took place on April. The last Pan American Games champion was Becky Collins of US.

This race consisted of two lengths of the pool, all in butterfly.

Results
All times are in minutes and seconds.

Heats

Final 
The final was held on April.

References

Swimming at the 1963 Pan American Games
Pan